Hu Fu may refer to:

Tiger tally, or hu fu
Hu Fo, or Hu Fu, Taiwanese political scientist

See also
Hufu